The 1888–89 English football season saw the first season of the Football League. In the late 1880s, Birmingham and the surrounding region boasted many of the country's strongest football teams.  Villa and several of the region's leading clubs joined the first two national leagues set up in England, the Football League and the Football Alliance.

Aston Villa were one of the new league's 12 founding members and finished as runners-up behind double winners Preston North End. The 'Invincibles' from Lancashire also ended Villa's bid to win every single home game, with a 2–0 win at Wellington Road in Villa's last home fixture.

Villa's cup season ended with an 8–1 defeat by Blackburn Rovers that remained a club record until 2012.

Local businessman, George Kynoch was appointed president of the club in 1888.

On 1 October 1888 Archie Goodall signed for Aston Villa. Goodall's move from Preston North End was the first transfer during a season to be approved by the Football League. Archie Goodall, playing at centre – half, made his Aston Villa debut on 13 October 1888, at Wellington Road, the then home of Aston Villa. Aston Villa defeated the visitors, Blackburn Rovers, 6 – 1 and Archie Goodall scored the second of Aston Villa’ six goals. Archie Goodall appeared in 14 of the 18 League matches played by Aston Villa from when Goodall joined the club and he scored seven League goals. Goodall played in defence, midfield and the forward–line for Aston Villa. Playing as a full–back/centre–half (four appearances) he was part of a defence-line that kept the opposition to one–League–goal–in–a–match once. Playing as a wing–half (five appearances) he was part of a midfield that achieved a big (three-League-goals-or-more) win once. As a forward (five appearances) he played in a front-line that scored three–League–goals–or–more on three separate occasions. Goodall' seven League goals for Aston Villa including two–League–goals–in–a–match twice. Goodall scored both Villa goals against Wolverhampton Wanderers in a 2 – 1 win at Wellington Road on 24 November 1888. On 8 December 1888 Goodall scored the second and fourth goals as Villa defeated Notts County 4 – 2 at Trent Bridge, the then home of Notts County.
In May 1889 Archie Goodall signed for Derby County.

Final league table

Results

Aston Villa's score comes first

Legend

Football League

FA Cup

Appearances

See also
Aston Villa F.C. in the 1880s

References

External links
avfchistory.co.uk 1888–89 season

Aston Villa F.C. seasons
Aston